Marcel Sembat is a station of the Paris Métro. It is named after the nearby place Marcel Sembat which was named after the journalist Marcel Sembat (1862–1922) who was a director of the socialist review La Petite République from 1892 to 1897 and husband of the painter Georgette Agutte from 1897 until their deaths in 1922. He was also the Minister of Public Works from 1914 to 1916 as well as socialist deputy for the 18th arrondissement of Paris's Grandes-Carrières district from 1893 till his death in 1922.

History 
The station opened on 3 February 1934 with the extension from Porte de Saint-Cloud to Pont de Sèvres, which was the first extension of the métro network beyond the limits of Paris. Hence, it is one of the first three stations to provide service to the inner suburbs of Paris (along with Billancourt and Pont de Sèvres).

As part of the "Renouveau du métro" programme by the RATP, the station's corridors was renovated and modernised on 23 April 2004.

In 2019, the station was used by 5,521,946 passengers, making it the 73rd busiest of the Métro network out of 302 stations.

In 2020, the station was used by 2,845,520 passengers amidst the COVID-19 pandemic, making it the 59th busiest of the Métro network out of 305 stations.

In 2021, the station was used by 3,874,792 passengers, making it the 62nd busiest of the Métro network out of 305 stations.

Passenger services

Access 
The station has 7 accesses divided into 8 access points:

 Access 1: avenue Victor Hugo (with an ascending escalator)
 Access 2: place Marcel-Sembat
 Access 3: avenue Édouard Vaillant
 Access 4: rue des Quatre Cheminées Patinoire Municipale
 Access 5: avenue André Morizet
 Access 6: rue Rieux
 Access 7: rue Danjou

Station layout

Platforms 
The station has a standard configuration with 2 tracks surrounded by 2 side platforms.

Other connections 
The station is also served by lines 42, 123, 126, 175, and 571 (SUBB) (Boucle Nord) of the RATP bus network, and at night, by lines N12, N61, and N45 of the Noctilien network.

Gallery

References

Roland, Gérard (2003). Stations de métro. D’Abbesses à Wagram. Éditions Bonneton.

Paris Métro stations in Boulogne-Billancourt
Railway stations in France opened in 1934